Antoine Pazur (3 January 1931 – 20 October 2011) was a French footballer. He played in one match for the France national football team in 1953. He was also named in France's squad for the Group 4 qualification tournament for the 1954 FIFA World Cup.

References

1931 births
2011 deaths
French footballers
France international footballers
Place of birth missing
Association footballers not categorized by position